Paul B. Higginbotham (born October 14, 1954) is a retired judge of the Wisconsin Court of Appeals. He was the first African American to serve on the court.

Biography
Higginbotham was born on October 14, 1954, in Philadelphia, Pennsylvania. His father was a civil rights activist and marched with Martin Luther King Jr., during the March on Washington for Jobs and Freedom. He is a graduate of the University of Wisconsin–Madison and the University of Wisconsin Law School and is a resident of Fitchburg, Wisconsin. Though the judicial offices held were officially non-partisan, he is a Democrat.

Career
From 1985 to 1986, Higginbotham was an attorney with the Legal Aid Society of Milwaukee, Wisconsin. He was later a member of the faculty of the University of Wisconsin Law School. From 1992 to 1993, he served as City of Madison, Wisconsin Municipal Judge. He was the a Wisconsin Circuit Court Judge from 1994 until joining the Court of Appeals in 2003. That year he ran for election to the Wisconsin Supreme Court, but was defeated in the February primary election with the seat ultimately going to Patience D. Roggensack.  Judge Roggensack's elevation created a vacancy on the Wisconsin Court of Appeals, and Governor Jim Doyle appointed Judge Higginbotham to the empty seat.  Judge Higginbotham won re-election without opposition in 2005 and 2011. In May 2016, Higginbotham announced that he would not seek re-election to the Wisconsin Court of Appeals in the 2017 Wisconsin Spring Election.

Redistricting commission
After a 2011 redistricting law, passed by a partisan Republican legislature and signed by a Republican governor, Wisconsin became one of the worst gerrymandered states in the country.  In July 2020, Wisconsin Governor Tony Evers announced the creation of a redistricting commission in an effort to create a nonpartisan alternative to the contentious process that had resulted in years of legal challenges and disputes. Evers appointed Judge Higginbotham, along with retired judges Janine P. Geske and Joseph Troy, as a panel to select the members of the proposed redistricting commission.

Electoral history

Wisconsin Circuit Court (1994, 2000)

| colspan="6" style="text-align:center;background-color: #e9e9e9;"| General Election, April 5, 1994

| colspan="6" style="text-align:center;background-color: #e9e9e9;"| General Election, April 4, 2000

Wisconsin Supreme Court (2003)

| colspan="6" style="text-align:center;background-color: #e9e9e9;"| Primary Election, February 18, 2003

| colspan="6" style="text-align:center;background-color: #e9e9e9;"| General Election, April 1, 2003

Wisconsin Court of Appeals (2005, 2011)

| colspan="6" style="text-align:center;background-color: #e9e9e9;"| General Election, April 5, 2005

| colspan="6" style="text-align:center;background-color: #e9e9e9;"| General Election, April 5, 2011

See also
 List of African-American jurists
 List of first minority male lawyers and judges in Wisconsin

References

Lawyers from Philadelphia
People from Fitchburg, Wisconsin
Wisconsin Court of Appeals judges
Wisconsin lawyers
Wisconsin Democrats
University of Wisconsin–Madison alumni
University of Wisconsin Law School alumni
University of Wisconsin Law School faculty
1954 births
Living people